Congenital hypoplastic anemia is a type of aplastic anemia which is primarily due to a congenital disorder.

Associated genes include TERC, TERT, IFNG, NBS1, PRF1, and SBDS.

Examples include:
 Fanconi anemia
 Diamond–Blackfan anemia

References

External links 

Aplastic anemias